

Deep Space Rendezvous

EVAs

Orbital launch summary

By country

By rocket

By orbit

References

Footnotes

 
Spaceflight by year